The 2008–09 season was the 129th season of competitive football in England. The Premier League started on 16 August 2008, while the Championship, League One, and League Two matches started on 9 August 2008. The regular season of the Football League ended on 3 May 2009, while the Premier League ended on 24 May 2009.

Managerial changes

In-season managerial changes

End-of-season managerial changes

Notes
1 Joe Kinnear was named interim manager on 26 September, and signed as permanent manager on 28 November.
2 Dean Glover had previously been caretaker manager at Port Vale since Sinnott's departure.
3 Tony Adams had previously been caretaker manager at Portsmouth since Redknapp's departure.
4 Greg Abbott had previously been caretaker manager at Carlisle United since Ward's departure.
5 Phil Parkinson had previously been caretaker manager at Charlton Athletic since Pardew's departure.
6 Ricky Sbragia had previously been caretaker manager at Sunderland since Keane's departure.
7 Eddie Howe had previously been caretaker manager at Bournemouth since Quinn's departure.
8 Bryan Gunn had previously been caretaker manager at Norwich City since Roeder's departure.
9 Ian Hendon had previously been caretaker manager at Barnet since Fairclough's departure.

National team
The home team is on the left column; the away team is on the right column.

Friendly matches

World Cup qualifiers
England is currently in Group 6 of the 2010 FIFA World Cup qualification process.

Honours

League tables

Premier League

Manchester United won their 18th league title, drawing level with Liverpool for the record of most league titles. Liverpool pushed them all the way; they actually had a superior goal difference and completed the double over United, even winning 4–1 at Old Trafford in March, but also suffered 11 draws which enabled United to overtake and win the title. Chelsea broke records for all the wrong reasons as their 86-game unbeaten home record finally came to an end, with several surprise away losses effectively ending their title challenge (as well as resulting in manager Luiz Felipe Scolari being sacked), though they did win the FA Cup under caretaker manager Guus Hiddink. Arsenal finished fourth to claim the final Champions League spot, which meant that last season's top 4 all qualified for Europe's elite for the fifth time in six seasons.

Aston Villa had looked like breaking into the Champions League spots for most of the season, but a late collapse that saw them win just twice in their last 13 league games saw them join FA Cup finalists Everton in qualifying for the newly formed UEFA Europa League (which replaced the UEFA Cup). Fulham were the other team to qualify for Europe, marking a remarkable turnaround since Roy Hodgson had taken over 18 months earlier when relegation from the Premier League looked a certainty. This was not only the first time they had qualified for Europe via their league position, but in finishing 7th in the first tier, this was also the highest ever league finish in the club's history. Stoke City, despite being pre-season relegation favourites for many, defied their critics and finishing comfortably in mid-table.

West Bromwich Albion made an immediate return to the Championship after propping up the table for most of the season. Joining them on the final day were Middlesbrough and Newcastle United, ending 11 and 16-year spells in the top flight respectively, the latter going through four managers in Kevin Keegan, Joe Kinnear, Chris Hughton and even former striker Alan Shearer during the campaign. Sunderland survived relegation, thanks to the efforts of caretaker manager Ricky Sbragia after Roy Keane's surprise resignation in December; meaning next season they would be the only North-East team in top flight football. Despite a brilliant start to the season (Which included victories at Arsenal and Tottenham, a draw at Liverpool and a narrow 4–3 loss at Manchester United, and climbing as high as third place in October), Hull City won just one league game after the new year, but avoided relegation by a single point.

Leading goalscorer: Nicolas Anelka (Chelsea) – 19

Football League Championship

Five years after being relegated from the Premier League, Wolverhampton Wanderers returned to the top flight in style as champions, having been in the top 2 for virtually all the season since August. Birmingham City were runners-up, making this the fourth season in a row that they had swapped divisions. Burnley joined them by beating Sheffield United in the play-off final, earning their place in the top flight after a 33-year absence.

Cardiff City occupied a play-off position for much of the season, but agonisingly slipped out of them on the final day after obtaining just one point in their final four league games. Preston North End in contrast, took twelve points from their final four league games, including a 6–0 win over Cardiff to finish ahead of them by courtesy of having scored one goal more throughout the season. Doncaster Rovers who were favourites to go straight back down and in the second tier after half a century out, achieved a respectable mid-table finish ahead of former Premier League teams in Crystal Palace, Coventry City, Blackpool, Derby County, Nottingham Forest and Barnsley.

Charlton suffered their second relegation in three years, despite a run of just one loss out of eight games at the end of the season. Southampton also crashed out of the division amid financial worries, which also meant they would be starting the 2009–10 season in League One with a ten-point deduction for entering administration. Norwich were the third relegated club, meaning that all three relegated clubs had been in the Premier League as recently as 2005 and had long left the third tier (Charlton last competed in the third tier in 1981, Southampton and Norwich in 1960).

Leading goalscorer: Sylvan Ebanks-Blake (Wolverhampton Wanderers) – 25

Football League One

Leicester comfortably won promotion in their first-ever season at this level, leading the table for virtually the entire season, going half the season (23 consecutive games) unbeaten and losing just 4 games in the process. Nigel Pearson brought stability to the club in becoming their first manager in five years to last an entire season as they looked to turn the corner after several years of struggle. Peterborough were runners-up, winning their second successive promotion and entering the second tier for only the second time in their history. Scunthorpe grabbed the final play-off place on the last day of the season in a winner takes all match v 7th place Tranmere Rovers and won promotion through them, making an immediate return to the Championship after being relegated the previous year.

Stockport went into administration before the final match of the season and so suffered a 10-point penalty; however, there was no real chance of them being relegated as a result of this penalty, barring an extremely unlikely set of results on the final day.

Hereford made an immediate return to League Two, finishing bottom in their first campaign at this level for thirty years. Cheltenham improved late in the season, but it proved too late to prevent relegation. Crewe suffered a late collapse and went down to League Two, having looked safe a few weeks previously. Northampton were relegated on the final day of the season after losing at Leeds and other results went against them. Brighton had looked certainties for relegation in the closing weeks, but the appointment of Russell Slade as manager saw them claim 16 points out of a possible 21 to survive. Carlisle and Hartlepool both survived on the last day.

Leading goalscorer: Simon Cox (Swindon Town) – 29, and Rickie Lambert (Bristol Rovers) – 29

Football League Two

Brentford made a return to League One as champions, the second club to win the fourth tier three times since Doncaster Rovers. Exeter won their second successive promotion, and on the final day of the season managed to pip Wycombe Wanderers for the runners-up spot. Wycombe themselves managed the final automatic promotion spot by virtue of a single goal over Bury. The play-offs were won by Gillingham, who made an immediate return to League One after the previous season's relegation.

Several teams suffered heavy points deductions during the season. Rotherham were docked 17 points at the start of the season and Darlington 10 points later on. Without these penalties they would have both qualified for the play-offs, but instead managed only mid table. Bournemouth also suffered a 17-point deduction pre-season, and halfway through it looked to be enough to cost them their League status; however, a fightback under new manager Eddie Howe saw them climb to safety and secure survival with a game to spare.

Luton suffered the heaviest deduction however, and the loss of 30 points proved too much for them to survive (though they would still have been relegated, albeit while finishing a place higher, had they only suffered the same 17-point deduction as Bournemouth and Rotherham). They suffered their third successive relegation and dropped out of the league, making them only the third English team to suffer three successive relegations, and the first to drop from the second tier to the Conference in successive years. The other relegated team was Chester City, who were statistically the worst team in the division and returned to the Conference after only five years. This would ultimately be the final season that the club completed, as they folded in March 2010, before the end of the following campaign. Grimsby would also have suffered relegation, if not for Luton's points deduction.

Leading goalscorers: Simeon Jackson (Gillingham) – 20, Grant Holt (Shrewsbury Town) – 20, and Jack Lester (Chesterfield) – 20

Movements for the 2009–10 season

Clubs removed
 Team Bath (Conference South)
 Gresley Rovers (Northern Premier League, Division One South)

Transfer deals

Notable debutants

 1 November 2008 – Jordan Henderson, 18-year-old midfielder, makes his debut as a substitute in Sunderland's 5–0 Premier League defeat at Chelsea.

Retirements
 14 July 2008 – Neil Moss, 33, former Bournemouth goalkeeper.
 20 August 2008 – Alan Stubbs, 36, former Bolton Wanderers, Celtic, Everton, Sunderland and Derby County defender.
 28 August 2008 – Andy Cooke, 34, former Burnley, Stoke City, Bradford City, Darlington and Shrewsbury Town striker.
 3 September 2008 – Rob Clare, 25, former Stockport County and Blackpool defender.
 3 September 2008 – Antti Niemi, 36, former Southampton and Fulham goalkeeper.
 25 September 2008 – Christian Roberts, 28, former Cardiff City, Exeter City, Bristol City and Swindon striker.
 3 October 2008 – Damien Francis, 29, former Wimbledon, Norwich City, Wigan Athletic and Watford defensive midfielder.
 11 November 2008 – Andrew Cole, 37, former Arsenal, Fulham, Bristol City, Newcastle United, Manchester United, Manchester City, Portsmouth, Sunderland, Birmingham City, Burnley and Nottingham Forest striker.
 6 December 2008 – Darren Anderton, 36, former Portsmouth, Tottenham Hotspur, Birmingham City, Wolverhampton Wanderers and Bournemouth attacking midfielder.
 6 January 2009 – Paul Mitchell, 27, former Wigan Athletic, Halifax Town, Swindon, Wrexham, Barnet and Milton Keynes Dons defender and midfielder.
 21 January 2009 – Shane Tudor, 26, former Wolverhampton Wanderers, Cambridge United, Leyton Orient and Port Vale winger.
 22 April 2009 – Andy Booth, 35, former Huddersfield Town, Sheffield Wednesday and Tottenham Hotspur striker.
 25 April 2009 – Fabian Wilnis, 38, former Ipswich Town and Grays Athletic defender.
 15 May 2009 – Martin Laursen, 31, former Aston Villa defender.
 End of season – Richie Barker, 34, former Doncaster Rovers, Brighton & Hove Albion, Macclesfield Town, Mansfield Town, Hartlepool United and Rotherham United striker.

References